The 1993 Australian Grand Prix was a Formula One motor race held at Adelaide on 7 November 1993. It was the sixteenth and final race of the 1993 Formula One World Championship.

The 79-lap race was won by Ayrton Senna, driving a McLaren-Ford. Alain Prost, in his final Grand Prix before retirement, finished second in his Williams-Renault, with teammate Damon Hill third.

Riccardo Patrese and Derek Warwick also retired from F1 after this race, Patrese having competed in a then-record 256 Grands Prix. Senna's victory would turn out to be the 41st and last victory in his Formula One career, and the last time he would finish on the podium, score points, or even finish a race. It was also the last win for a Brazilian driver until Rubens Barrichello in 2000.

By winning this race McLaren surpassed Ferrari as the most successful F1 constructor in number of wins (until the 1995 Canadian Grand Prix). McLaren achieved the final pole position and win for their car entered in the livery of Marlboro as their title sponsor, which also would be the last pole position and win for the team until the 1997 season. This race was also the last time the Williams team was sponsored by Canon and the Benetton team was sponsored by Camel before switching to sponsorship by Rothmans and Mild Seven respectively in the 1994 season.

Report

Qualifying
Senna took his first pole position since the 1992 Canadian Grand Prix, in the process breaking a run of 24 straight poles for Williams and preventing that team from achieving a clean sweep for the season. Prost was alongside on the front row, with Damon Hill in the second Williams and Michael Schumacher in the Benetton on the second row, and Mika Häkkinen in the second McLaren and Gerhard Berger in the Ferrari on the third. Berger had his Saturday qualifying times removed after doing 18 laps, above the limit of 12. The top ten was completed by Jean Alesi in the second Ferrari, Martin Brundle in the Ligier, Patrese in the second Benetton, and Aguri Suzuki in the Footwork.

Despite being the fastest qualifier in his Ford V8-powered McLaren, Senna was some  slower on the 890m-long Brabham Straight than the Renault V10-powered Williams of Hill.

Race
It took three attempts to get the race underway. On the first attempt, Brundle's Ligier was left on the grid at the start of the formation lap, before Ukyo Katayama stalled his Tyrrell and the start was aborted. On the second attempt, Eddie Irvine missed his grid slot and stalled his Jordan. Again, the start was aborted. Katayama and Irvine were sent to the back of the grid for the third, successful, attempt.

The top four retained their positions into the first corner, while Häkkinen made a bad start and fell behind Berger.

While Senna pulled out a small lead, the two Williams cars and Schumacher stayed together. Schumacher pitted early on lap 15 and rejoined in fourth but his engine failed on lap 20. Senna pitted on lap 24, allowing Prost to lead until his own stop five laps later, while Häkkinen's race went from bad to worse as he had a slow stop, allowing Alesi and Brundle to get ahead of him, before his brakes failed on lap 29.

Senna pitted for the second time on lap 55, by which time the Williamses had already made their second stops, and this enabled the Brazilian to retain a healthy lead. Meanwhile, Alesi got ahead of team-mate Berger while Patrese got ahead of Brundle. On lap 61, Hill tried to catch Prost by surprise for second place. Prost, however, moved over to block, causing Hill to back off and spin, losing time but no places.

Senna duly won from Prost by nine seconds, with Hill a further 24 seconds back. Alesi and Berger were fourth and fifth, one lap down, while Patrese was set to finish sixth in his 256th and last race, only for his fuel pressure to drop on the last lap and thus hand Brundle the last point.

Prost thus signed off on his F1 career with his fourth Drivers' Championship and 99 points. Senna's win enabled him to secure second place in the standings with 73 points, just ahead of Hill on 69. Schumacher was fourth with 52, with a big gap to team-mate Patrese in fifth with 20, followed by Alesi (16), Brundle (13), Berger (12), Johnny Herbert (11) and Mark Blundell (10). In the Constructors' Championship, Williams finished with 168 points - four more than their tally from 1992, and double the tally of McLaren (84). Benetton were a close third with 72, while Ferrari (28) edged out Ligier (23) for fourth.

With Prost not defending his title, the Williams cars would once again bear the numbers 0 and 2 for 1994.

Post-race
During the podium celebrations, Senna invited both Prost and Hill up to the top step, much to the surprise of Prost. The move marked the first easing of tensions in the rivalry between the two men. Senna himself would later call the race 'the end of an era'. As was tradition in Adelaide, a rock concert was held inside the circuit following the race. For 1993 the concert was performed by Tina Turner as part of her What's Love? Tour (the concert was free to anyone with a ticket to the race). At one stage during the concert, Ayrton Senna appeared on stage, much to Turner's surprise. As a tribute to the Brazilian (and although she had already performed the song), Turner sang her hit "The Best".

Classification

Qualifying

Race

Championship standings after the race
 Bold text indicates the World Champions.

Drivers' Championship standings

Constructors' Championship standings

References

Grand Prix
Australian Grand Prix
Australian Grand Prix
Motorsport in Adelaide
Australian Grand Prix